Santa Fe Scouts is a 1943 American Western "Three Mesquiteers" B-movie directed by Howard Bretherton and starring Bob Steele, Tom Tyler and Jimmie Dodd.

Cast
 Bob Steele as Tucson Smith
 Tom Tyler as Stony Brooke
 Jimmie Dodd as Lullaby Joslin
 Lois Collier as Claire Robbins
 John James as Tim Clay
 Elizabeth Valentine as Minerva Clay
 Tom Chatterton as Neil Morgan
 Tom London as Billy Dawson
 Budd Buster as Wid
 Jack Ingram as Henchman Howard
 Kermit Maynard as Rancher Ben Henderson

References

External links

1943 films
1943 Western (genre) films
American Western (genre) films
American black-and-white films
Films directed by Howard Bretherton
Republic Pictures films
Three Mesquiteers films
1940s English-language films
1940s American films